The Summit of the Americas (SOA) is an international summit meeting that brings together the leaders of countries in the Organization of American States (OAS). Cuba was expelled from the OAS under pressure from the United States after the Cuban Revolution of 1959. Cuba participated in the 2015 summit in Panama, and sent its foreign minister to the subsequent 2018 summit in Peru.  In the early 1990s, the formerly ad hoc summits were institutionalized into a regular "Summit of the Americas" based on the principles of democracy and free trade. The meetings, organized by a number of multilateral bodies led by the OAS, provide an opportunity for discussions about a variety of issues and topics.

The last summit to take place was the 9th Summit of the Americas in Los Angeles, United States of America from June 8–10, 2022.

List of summits

The events that garnered the most general public and media attention were the Quebec City and Mar del Plata summits (3rd and 4th respectively), both of which provoked very large anti-globalization and anti-Free Trade Area of the Americas protests and attendant police response.

OAS member states 

All 35 independent nations of the Americas are members of the OAS.

Non-members
The following jurisdictions are not members of the OAS as they are dependencies of other nations. They are grouped under the nation that has sovereignty over them.

See also
Inter-American Development Bank
Organization of American States

References

 Twaddle, Andrew C. (2002).  Health Care Reform Around the World. Westport, Connecticut: Greenwood Publishing.  ;  OCLC 48132063

External links
Summits of the Americas
The Fifth Summit of The Americas
Summits of the Americas Follow-up System (SISCA)
Follow-up and Implementation of Summits
Summits Virtual community (SVC)

Organization of American States
Politics of the Americas
20th-century diplomatic conferences
21st-century diplomatic conferences (Americas)